"Dance Me to the End of Love" is a 1984 song by Canadian singer Leonard Cohen. It was first performed by Cohen on his 1984 album Various Positions. It has been recorded by various artists and in 2009 was described as "trembling on the brink of becoming a standard."

Leonard Cohen original version
"Dance Me to the End of Love" is a 1984 song by Leonard Cohen and first recorded by him for his 1984 album Various Positions. The song follows a typical Greek "Hasapiko" dance path, most probably inspired by Cohen's long-lasting affiliation to the Greek island of Hydra. It has since been recorded by various artists, and has been described as "trembling on the brink of becoming a standard".

Although structured as a love song, "Dance Me to the End Of Love" was in fact inspired by the Holocaust. In a 1995 radio interview, Cohen said of the song:

In 1996, Welcome Books published the book Dance Me to the End of Love, as part of its "Art & Poetry" series, featuring the lyrics of the song alongside paintings by Henri Matisse.

Charts

Madeleine Peyroux version 

Jazz singer Madeleine Peyroux included "Dance Me to the End of Love" on her second solo album, Careless Love (2004). It was released as the second single for the album and has been a part of her concert set-list since then.

Peyroux's rendition was included on the fifth and last of the Queer as Folk soundtracks, as well as on the soundtrack of the 2009 computer game The Saboteur.

Interviewing Peyroux in 2012, The Huffington Post described the song as a "haunting 2004 rendition ... undoubtedly one of modern music's brightest highlights. An inspired, exquisite cover that besides drawing countless comparison's to Billie Holiday's singing, brought the free spirited musician to just artistic prominence."

Other versions
Batsheva (Capek) – an English/Yiddish version on her 2012 CD I, Batsheva, Singer
Sting performed the song at the 2017 Tower of Song: A Memorial Tribute to Leonard Cohen concert

Painting
The Scottish painter Jack Vettriano created a painting with the same title. He has also made two other paintings named after and inspired by Leonard Cohen works: one based on Cohen's novel Beautiful Losers and the other inspired by his song "Bird on the Wire". When asked on Desert Island Discs, Vettriano mentioned Leonard Cohen's album I'm Your Man as one of his must-have records.

References 

1984 songs
Leonard Cohen songs
Columbia Records singles
Songs written by Leonard Cohen
Songs about dancing
Music videos directed by Mark Pellington
Songs about the Holocaust